Duramente (22 March 2012 – 31 August 2021) was a Japanese Thoroughbred racehorse. In 2015 he completed the first two legs of the Japanese Triple Crown by winning the Satsuki Shō and the Tokyo Yūshun before his season was ended by injury. He returned in 2016 to win the Nakayama Kinen and finish second in the Dubai Sheema Classic before his racing career was ended by a leg injury sustained in the Takarazuka Kinen. He made a promising start to his career as a breeding stallion before dying at the age of nine.

Background
Duramente was a bay horse with a white coronet marking on his left hind leg, bred in Japan by Northern Racing. His sire, King Kamehameha was one of the best Japanese colts of his generation, beating a field including Heart's Cry and Daiwa Major in the 2004 Japanese Derby. His other winners as a breeding stallion include Lord Kanaloa, Rose Kingdom, Belshazzar (Japan Cup Dirt), Rulership (Queen Elizabeth II Cup), Apapane and Rey de Oro. Duramente's dam Admire Groove was a top-class racemare who twice won the Queen Elizabeth II Commemorative Cup and was voted the Best Older Filly or Mare in Japan in 2004. She was a daughter of Sunday Silence and Air Groove, a mare who won the Yushun Himba and the Tenno Sho and was voted Japanese Horse of the Year in 1997.

During his racing career, Duramente (Italian for hard) has been owned by Sunday Racing Co. Ltd. and trained by Noriyuki Hori.

Racing career

2014: two-year-old season
Duramente began his racing career in a maiden race over 1800 metres at Tokyo Racecourse on 12 October and finished second of the eleven runners behind Love Your Man. In a similar race at the same course a month later he recorded his first victory, beating Shonen Harakasu and twelve others.

2015: three-year-old season
On his first appearance as a three-year-old, Duramente won the Saintpaulia Sho over 1800 metres at Tokyo on 1 February. Two weeks later over the same course and distance, the colt was moved up in class to contest the Grade 3 Kyodo News Service Hai. Ridden by Syu Ishibashi he started 4/5 favourite in a twelve-runner field but was beaten half a length by Sunday Racing's other runner Real Steel.

On 19 April Duramente was ridden by Mirco Demuro when he was one of fifteen colts to contest the 75th running of the Grade 1 Satsuki Sho over 2000 metres at Nakayama Racecourse. The Italian Demuro had recently become one of the first two foreign jockeys (alongside Christophe Lemaire) to receive a full license from the Japan Racing Association. Duramente started 3.6/1 third choice in the betting behind Satono Crown (also trained by Noriyuki Hori) and Real Steel. After racing towards the rear of the field he made a forward move approaching the final turn but veered left, interfering with several other horses when Demuro moved him up to challenge entering the straight. In the closing stages the colt produced a strong burst of acceleration to take the lead 100 metres from the finish and won by one and a half lengths from Real Steel with Kitasan Black two and a half lengths back in third. Demuro, who received a suspension for causing interference said, "He was easy to ride early in the race but he's very highly strung, it was his first time going right-handed and the crowd was very loud too so he may have over-reacted at the fourth corner—he gave me a bit of a fright".

Six weeks after his win at Nakayama, Duramente started favourite for the 82nd Tokyo Yushun (Japanese Derby) over 2400 metres at Tokyo. After racing in eighth place he moved up as the field fanned wide on the final turn. He took the lead approaching the last 200 metres and won by one and three quarter lengths from Satono Rasen with Satono Crown in third. Duramente's winning time of 2:23.2 was a new race record, breaking the mark set by his sire King Kamehameha in 2004. Demuro commented "I’m so full of joy and gratitude to have been able to accomplish this with such a powerful and talented colt and especially as an official JRA jockey".

In late June it was announced that Duramente had sustained "distal fractures" to both of his front legs and would be unable to race again for at least six months. He did not appear again in 2015.

2016: four-year-old season
Duramente returned after an absence of almost nine months in the Nakayama Kinen on 28 February. Starting the 11/10 favourite he took the lead on the outside on the final turn and held off a late challenge from Ambitious to win by a neck. He was then sent to the United Arab Emirates to contest the Dubai Sheema Classic on 26 March. He lost a shoe before the race and as it could not be replaced he competed in the race with three shoes. He finished second behind the British-trained five-year-old Postponed. The colt took a long time to recover from the race and did not reappear until 26 June when he was made the 1.9/1 favourite for the Takarazuka Kinen at Hanshin. He was restrained towards the rear of the seventeen runner field before being switched to the outside to deliver his run in the straight. Duramente made up a great deal of ground, passing horse after horse in the closing stages, but failed by a neck to catch the mare Marialite. The colt slipped crossing the finishing line sustaining serious injury to his left foreleg and a subsequent veterinary examination revealed extensive damage to his fetlock, pastern and tendons. Three days after the Takarazuka Kinen it was announced that Duramente was to be retired from racing and would stand as a breeding stallion at Northern Farm in 2017. Mirco Demuro commented "I'm shocked. Duramente's the strongest horse I've ever ridden".

Assessment and awards
In the JRA Awards for 2015, Duramente was voted Best Three-Year-Old Colt taking 285 of the 291 votes. In the poll for Japanese Horse of the Year he finished third in the voting behind Maurice and Lovely Day.

Stud record
In his first season as a breeding stallion Duramente sired the Kikuka Sho , Tenno Sho (Spring) and Takarazuka Kinen winner Titleholder, while his second crop of foals included the Oka Sho winner Stars on Earth. He died on 31 August 2021 due to acute colitis at the age of nine.

Major winners

c = colt, f = filly

Pedigree

References

2012 racehorse births
2021 racehorse deaths
Racehorses bred in Japan
Racehorses trained in Japan
Thoroughbred family 8-f